Bob Heleringer (born 1951) is an American politician. He served as a Republican member for the 33rd district of the Kentucky House of Representatives.

In 1980, Heleringer won the election for the 33rd district of the Kentucky House of Representatives. He succeeded Bob Benson. In 2002, Heleringer term ended for the 33rd district, in which it was vacant. He currently writes articles for The Courier-Journal.

References 

1951 births
Living people
Place of birth missing (living people)
Republican Party members of the Kentucky House of Representatives
20th-century American politicians
21st-century American politicians
Courier Journal people